Rees v Sinclair [1974] 1 NZLR 180  is a cited case in New Zealand regarding liability for negligence against lawyers. It effectively reinforced the English case of Rondel v Worsley into New Zealand case law.

Background
Ree had Sinclair represent him in a court case. Rather ironically, Ree was a retired lawyer himself. Anyway, Ree believed Sinclair was negligent in handling his case, and sued him for professional negligence.

Sinclair defended the matter by claiming barristerial immunity.

References

Court of Appeal of New Zealand cases
1974 in New Zealand law
1974 in case law
New Zealand tort case law